Emil Stær (27 February 1989, Aarhus) is a Danish sprint canoeist.  At the 2012 Summer Olympics, he competed in the Men's K-2 1000 metres finishing ninth place, and Men's K-4 1000 metres, finishing in fifth place.

References

Danish male canoeists
Living people
Olympic canoeists of Denmark
Canoeists at the 2012 Summer Olympics

1989 births
Sportspeople from Aarhus